The Winner's Journey is a live album and DVD based on Australian Idol 2006 winner Damien Leith's performances on the show. The full-length album features remastered versions of Leith's live performances from the show, along with the studio version of his debut single "Night of My Life" and two of his original tracks, "Come to Me" and "Sky". The album was certified platinum on its first week release, and was certified four times platinum on its second week. It remained the number one album on the ARIA Charts for five weeks, and remained in the top ten for a total of ten weeks.

The album won an ARIA Music Award in October 2007, for "Highest Selling Album".

Track listing
CD
 "Night of My Life" (studio version) - 3:34
 "Come to Me" - 4:32
 "Crying" - 1:49
 "Wicked Game" - 3:18
 "Nessun Dorma" - 3:00
 "Hallelujah" - 2:31
 "Message to My Girl" - 3:20
 "If Tomorrow Never Comes" - 2:14
 "Creep" - 1:45
 "Unchained Melody" - 2:52
 "Never Meant to Fail" - 2:32
 "Waiting on an Angel" - 2:38
 "Sky" - 3:31
 "Night of My Life" (live version) - 3:31

DVD
 "With or Without You"
 "Creep"
 "If Tomorrow Never Comes"
 "Sorry Seems to Be the Hardest Word"
 "Celebration"
 "Wicked Game"
 "Sky"
 "High and Dry"
 "Message to My Girl"
 "Crying"
 "Hallelujah"
 "Nessun Dorma"
 "Unchained Melody"
 "Never Meant to Fail"
 "Waiting on an Angel"
 "Night of My Life"
 "Damien's Profile"
 "Danny Boy"
 "Come to Me"

Charts

Weekly charts

Year-end charts

Decade-end chart

Certification

References

External links
Album info from Sony BMG

2006 debut albums
ARIA Award-winning albums
Damien Leith albums
Sony BMG live albums
Live video albums
2006 live albums
2006 video albums